Ali Reza Abbasi Tabrizi was a prominent Persian calligrapher and calligraphy teacher, who flourished in 16th-17th century Safavid Iran. He was titled by Abbas I as Šāhnavāz Xān. Abbasi was a master of Naskh and Thuluth scripts and the initiator of his own style of Nastaʿlīq script. Besides he was an expert of various other scripts like Muhaqqaq, Reqa, Reyhan, Tevki and Taʿlīq scripts.

Youth 
Ali Reza Abbasi started learning calligraphy in Tabriz as a pupil of Mohammad Hossein Tabrizi and Ala Beyk. Abbasi obtained an outstanding knowledge of Thuluth and Naskh scripts. After that the Ottomans occupied Tabriz in the era of Mohammad Khodabanda, Abbasi left the city and went to Qazvin, the capital of the Safavid dynasty. He lived there in the Jameh mosque of Qazvin. He worked as a calligrapher and completed some parts of inscriptions of the mosque and also some Koran samples. His works on the Jameh mosque of Qazvin made him famous. In the early years of the reign of Abbas I, he was in Farhad Khan's employ, who was an important Sardar of the Safavids and his rank and dignity was increasing under Abbass I. When Sardar Farhad Khan noticed that Alireza Abbasi was an able artist, he appointed him as his personal companion and took Abbasi as his companion to Khorasan and Mazandaran.

In the court of Safavids 
Alireza Abbasi's fame increased. On the 1st of July 1593 Abbasi became the King's intimate friend and the King instructed some of calligraphers like Mohammad Reza Emami, Mohammad Saleh Esfahani and Abd ol-Baghi Tabrizi to teach Abbasi Thuluth script.

He had a son named Badi al-Zaman Tabrizi.

Abbasi's death date in unknown, but it is supposed that he died towards the end of Safi's era.

References 

1500s births
1600s deaths
16th-century calligraphers of Safavid Iran
Calligraphers from Tabriz
17th-century calligraphers of Safavid Iran
16th-century Iranian painters
17th-century Iranian painters